Savannah is a village in Ashland County, Ohio, United States. The population was 413 at the 2010 census.

History

Savannah was laid out in 1818. A post office called Savannah has been in operation since 1839.

Geography
Savannah is located at  (40.965249, -82.365168), along the Vermilion River.

Demographics

2010 census
As of the census of 2010, there were 413 people, 139 households, and 108 families living in the village. The racial makeup of the village was 97.3% White, 1.2% African American, 1.0% Native American, and 0.5% from two or more races. Hispanic or Latino people of any race were 1.7% of the population.

There were 139 households, of which 41.7% had children under the age of 18 living with them, 55.4% were married couples living together, 14.4% had a female householder with no husband present, 7.9% had a male householder with no wife present, and 22.3% were non-families. 20.1% of all households were made up of individuals, and 8.7% had someone living alone who was 65 years of age or older. The average household size was 2.97 and the average family size was 3.39.

The median age in the village was 33.3 years. 29.8% of residents were under the age of 18; 7.5% were between the ages of 18 and 24; 27.8% were from 25 to 44; 25.4% were from 45 to 64; and 9.4% were 65 years of age or older. The gender makeup of the village was 49.4% male and 50.6% female.

2000 census
As of the census of 2000, there were 372 people, 134 households, and 103 families living in the village. The population density was 839.1 people per square mile (326.4/km). There were 147 housing units at an average density of 331.6 per square mile (129.0/km). The racial makeup of the village was 99.46% White, 0.27% African American and 0.27% Native American.

There were 134 households, out of which 38.8% had children under the age of 18 living with them, 62.7% were married couples living together, 6.7% had a female householder with no husband present, and 23.1% were non-families. 18.7% of all households were made up of individuals, and 8.2% had someone living alone who was 65 years of age or older. The average household size was 2.78 and the average family size was 3.20.

In the village, the population was spread out, with 30.1% under the age of 18, 9.4% from 18 to 24, 33.1% from 25 to 44, 18.0% from 45 to 64, and 9.4% who were 65 years of age or older. The median age was 33 years. For every 100 females there were 101.1 males. For every 100 females age 18 and over, there were 101.6 males.

The median income for a household in the village was $35,469, and the median income for a family was $38,182. Males had a median income of $33,333 versus $21,250 for females. The per capita income for the village was $14,546. About 8.7% of families and 9.6% of the population were below the poverty line, including 13.3% of those under age 18 and 14.7% of those age 65 or over.

Notable people
 Sarah Hearst Black, social reformer
 Eunice Lea Kettering, composer

References

External links
 Village website

Villages in Ashland County, Ohio
Villages in Ohio
1818 establishments in Ohio
Populated places established in 1818